Anna Favella (born September 21, 1983) is an Italian stage, television and movie actress. She is best known for her role as Elena Marsili in the TV series Terra Ribelle, directed by Cinzia TH Torrini, and Terra Ribelle – Il nuovo mondo, directed by Ambrogio Lo Giudice.

TV

TV series
 Framed! A Sicilian Murder Mystery, Netflix (2022-) 
 Luis Miguel (2018–2021)
 Le tre rose di Eva 4, directed by Raffaele Mertes - Canale 5 (2017)
 Il bello delle donne... alcuni anni dopo, directed by Eros Puglielli - Canale 5 (2016)
 Un medico in famiglia 10, directed by Elisabetta Marchetti  - Rai Uno (2016)
 Non è stato mio figlio, directed by Alessio Inturri and Luigi Parisi - Canale 5 (2015)
 Centovetrine - Canale 5 (2014-2015)
 Terra ribelle - Il Nuovo Mondo, directed by Ambrogio Lo Giudice - Rai Uno (2012)
 Terra ribelle, directed by Cinzia TH Torrini - Rai Uno (2010)
 Don Matteo 7, directed by Giulio Base - Rai Uno (2009)
 Enrico Mattei - L'uomo che guardava al futuro, directed by Giorgio Capitani - Rai Uno (2008)

Theatre 
 Walking on the Moon by Leonardo Ferrari Carissimi
 Hitchcock - A love story by Leonardo Ferrari Carissimi
 Tutti i padri vogliono far morire i loro figli by Leonardo Ferrari Carissimi
 Love - L'amore ai tempi della ragione permanente by Leonardo Ferrari Carissimi
 Cashmere WA by L. Staglianò, directed by M. Panici
 Delitto Pasolini - Una considerazione inattuale by Leonardo Ferrari Carissimi
 Being Hamlet - La Genesi  by Leonardo Ferrari Carissimi
 La terra desolata by Thomas Eliot
 Due dozzine di rose scarlatte by Aldo De Benedetti
 Il gobbo by S. Mrozek
 Ti amo... da morire by F. Draghetti e R. Stocchi
 Amianto - Paura di avere paura by Leonardo Ferrari Carissimi
 Tutti i colori della notte by A. Lauritano
 Il medico dei pazzi by Eduardo Scarpetta
 Blu Note Bar by Stefano Benni
 Sarto per signora by Georges Feydeau

Filmography

References

External links 

1983 births
Italian television actresses
Living people